Bernard Santal (born 17 February 1960) is a Swiss former racing driver.

References

1957 births
Living people
Swiss racing drivers
FIA European Formula 3 Championship drivers
International Formula 3000 drivers
IMSA GT Championship drivers
24 Hours of Le Mans drivers
World Sportscar Championship drivers
Barber Pro Series drivers
24 Hours of Spa drivers